The Maison du Sport International (International House of Sport) is an office complex opened in 2006 in Lausanne, Switzerland, via a joint venture between the City of Lausanne, the Canton of Vaud and the International Olympic Committee (IOC). It was created to entice all the World's sports governing bodies (also known as International Federations or IF's) to bring their headquarters to Lausanne, in order to improve their proximity to the headquarters of the IOC, and thus improve communications between these bodies.

However, many international federations have their offices elsewhere, often in a country where the specific sport traditionally has a regular following. With modern communications, the need for physical presence is also not as important anymore.

International federations at Maison du Sport International
Currently the tenants of the MSI, include these International Federations:
 FAI Fédération Aéronautique Internationale
 FITA International Archery Federation
 IBAF International Baseball Federation
 BWF Badminton World Federation (branch office)
 FIBT International Bobsleigh and Tobogganing Federation
 AIBA International Boxing Association
 UEC Union Européenne de Cyclisme
 WBF World Bridge Federation
 ICF International Canoe Federation
 FISO World OCR (Fédération Internationale de Sports d'Obstacles)
 FICS International Federation of Sports Chiropractic
 FIMS International Federation of Sports Medicine 
 FIE Fédération Internationale d'Escrime
 FIAS Federation International Amateur de Sambo 
 WBSC World Baseball Softball Confederation
 FISA International Rowing Federation
 WTF World Taekwondo Federation (branch office)
 FIDE Fédération Internationale des Échecs

Sports organizations at Maison du Sport International
And, these Sports organizations:
 IOC International Olympic Committee
 SportAccord (Formerly GAISF/AGFIS)
 ASOIF Association of Summer Olympic International Federations
 ICSD International Committee of Sports for the Deaf
 IMGA International Masters Games Association
 WFSGI World Federation of the Sporting Goods Industry
 AIPS International Sports Press Association
 CPA Cyclistes Professionnels Associés
 FISU International University Sports Federation
 WADA World Anti-Doping Agency European Office
 Académie Internationale des sciences et des techniques du sport
 Além International Management, Inc.

Sports companies at Maison du Sport International
 Sports Recruitment International
 Carlson Wagonlit Travel
 Ernst and Young
 Event Knowledge Services
 F2FX ;
 Libra Law
 IEC in Sport
 J. de Heer Consultants
 RBO Organisations
 SINERGI Sports Consulting
 J.-P. et R. Strebel, Consultants
 Sport and Arts Global Management (SAG)
 Sportcentric

References

External links

Commercial buildings in Switzerland
Buildings and structures in Lausanne
Commercial buildings completed in 2006
2006 establishments in Switzerland
Sport in Lausanne
21st-century architecture in Switzerland